Labordia cyrtandrae, the Koʻolau Range labordia, is a species of flowering plant in the Loganiaceae family. It is endemic to lowland tropical moist forests in Hawaii, and is threatened by habitat loss. Like other Labordia species, this plant is known as Kamakahala.

This species has been known from the Koʻolau and Waianae Ranges of Oahu. Today there are two individuals remaining in the Koʻolau Range, only one of which is mature, and 44 mature plants remain in the Waianae Range.

References

cyrtandrae
Endemic flora of Hawaii
Biota of Oahu
Taxonomy articles created by Polbot